Accurate or reliable data for historical populations of Armenians is scarce, but various scholars and institutions have proposed estimates for different periods.

For most recent data on Armenian populations, see Armenian population by country.

Ancient and medieval estimates
According to the Armenian National Atlas (2007), there were 2.5 to 3.5 million Armenians in the first century BC. The number of Armenians within the Armenian Highland rose to around 6 million by the early 13th century, prior to the Mongol invasion.

Elizabeth Redgate argues that the population of historical Armenia may never have exceeded 5 or 6 million as most of its extent was not fit for settlement.

19th and early 20th century
In his 1847 book Lands of the Bible: Visited and Described, the Scottish missionary John Wilson estimated the total Armenian population at 2.5 million, with 1 million in the Russian Empire, 1 million in the Ottoman Empire and 0.5 million in Persia and "other distant lands." In the same book, he quoted the figures provided by Lucas Balthazar (Ղուկաս Պալդազարեան), the "intelligent editor" of the Smyrna-based Armenian newspaper The Dawn of Ararat («Արշալոյս Արարատեան», Arshaluys Araratian). Balthazar estimated 5 million Armenians overall, with 2 million in Russia, 2 million in Turkey and 1 million in Persia, India and elsewhere.

The 9th edition of the Encyclopædia Britannica (1875) cited Édouard Dulaurier's estimates c. 1850: "approximately four millions of Armenians in the world, of whom 2,500,000 were inhabitants of the Ottoman empire, 1,200,000 of the Russian empire, 25,000 in the empire of Austria, 150,000 in Persia and Azerbaijan, 25,000 in continental India and the Archipelago of Asia, and the remaining 100,000 scattered in various countries."

In his 1862 book The Turkish Empire. In its Relations with Christianity and Civilization, Richard Robert Madden wrote that the Armenian population worldwide is estimated at 4 million, of whom an estimated 2,400,000 in the Ottoman Empire ("an approximate computation, and probably below the truth"), 900,000 in the Russian Empire, 600,000 in Persia, 40,000 in India and "other realms of Asia", and 60,000 in "various European countries."

In 1876 J. Buchan Telfer, Captain in the Royal Navy and Fellow of the Society of Antiquaries, quoted the figures provided by Garabed Ghazarosian in his 1873 The Universal Year Book (Տիեզերական տարեցոյց). According to the source, there were a total of 4.2 million Armenians worldwide, including 2.5 million in Turkish dominions, 1.5 million in Russia, 34,000 in Persia, 14,600 in Austria, 15,000 in England, India and other British possessions, 8,400 in Romania, 8,000 in Egypt, and 120,000 in other countries.

At the 1893 Parliament of the World's Religions, Armenian activist  claimed that there were 5.1 million Armenians in total, including 80,000 Catholics and 20,000 Protestants.

In his 1896 book Story of Turkey and Armenia Reverend James Wilson Pierce estimated 2.4 million Armenians in the Ottoman Empire, 1.25 million in the Russian Empire, 150,000 in Persia, 100,000 in Europe and 5,000 in the United States.

Ottoman Empire

Russian Empire
According to the Russian Empire Census of 1897, there were 1,173,096 native speakers of Armenian in the empire. The religious statistics indicated there to be 1,179,241 Armenian Apostolics and 38,840 Catholic Armenians, amounting to a total of 1,218,081.

Estimates by John Foster Fraser (1907) and Richard G. Hovannisian (2005) put the number of Armenians within the Russian Empire in the early 20th century at around 2 million. According to official estimates, 1,859,663 Armenians lived in the Caucasus Viceroyalty in 1916.

20th century

1911

Malachia Ormanian, a scholar and former Armenian Patriarch of Constantinople, estimated the population of Christian Armenians by the dioceses of the Armenian Apostolic Church in his 1911 book The Church of Armenia. It is the most detailed population distribution estimates available prior to the Armenian genocide. Robert Hewsen wrote that "Ormanian's figures appear moderate and reasonable, although this does not necessarily make them precise." Levon Marashlian notes that "the purpose of Ormanian's book was not to provide comprehensive population statistics" and that "his numbers for [Armenian] Protestants and Catholics may be even more incomplete" than for Armenian Apostolics.

1922
The United States Department of State summarized the populations of Armenians in a November 1922 document entitled "Approximate number of Armenians in the world" (NARA 867.4016/816). Of the total 3,004,000 Armenians, 817,873 were refugees from Turkey "based upon information furnished by the British Embassy, Constantinople, and by the agents of the Near East Relief Society, in 1921. The total given does not include the able-bodied Armenians, who are retained by the Kemalists, nor the women and children,—approximately 95,000,—according to the League of Nations-who have been forced to embrace Islam."

1923
source

1966
The following estimates were originally published on 4 December 1966 in the Yerevan-based weekly Hayreniki dzayn («Հայրենիքի ձայն») of Soviet Armenia's Committee for Cultural Relations with Armenians Abroad. They were cited by Richard Hrair Dekmejian in the journal Soviet Studies in 1968 and by David Marshall Lang and Christopher J. Walker in 1976 in Minority Rights Group's entry on Armenians.

1986
Armenian Soviet Encyclopedia, Volume XIII ("Soviet Armenia"), 1987

21st century

2012
Armenia Encyclopedia, 2012

Previous (historical) censuses

By country
Soviet statistics from 1926 to 1989 for the former Soviet republics are given below and not repeated in this table.

Former countries and territories

Soviet republics (1926–1989)

Precise figures are available for the number of Armenians in the Soviet Union and its constituent republics because all censuses in the USSR enumerated people by ethnicity.

See also
Historical Jewish population comparisons

References
Notes

Citations

Further reading
Voskanian, Armenak (1985). Սփյուռքահայության թվական կազմը (Number of Armenians abroad), Lraber Hasarakakan Gitutyunneri, No. 9 . pp. 47–51. ISSN 0320-8117

Armenian diaspora by country